Brandegg is a request stop railway station in the municipality of Grindelwald in the Swiss canton of Bern. The station is served by the Wengernalpbahn (WAB), whose trains operate from Grindelwald to Kleine Scheidegg.

The guide books state that the station buffet serves the best apple fritters in the world. There is an official Apple Fritter Walk - Der Öpfelchüechliweg. The station is served by the following passenger trains:

References

External links 
 

Railway stations in the canton of Bern
Grindelwald